Bacillus boroniphilus is a species of highly boron-tolerant bacterium, hence its name. It is Gram-positive, motile, and rod-shaped, with type strain T-15ZT (DSM 17376T = IAM 15287T = ATCC BAA-1204T). Its genome has been sequenced.

This species has been recently transferred into the genus Mesobacillus. The correct nomenclature is Mesobacillus boroniphilus.

References

Further reading

External links

LPSN
Type strain of Bacillus boroniphilus at BacDive -  the Bacterial Diversity Metadatabase

boroniphilus
Bacteria described in 2007